TSG Friesenheim  is a handball club from Ludwigshafen, Germany that as of 2021/22 competes in the 2. Handball-Bundesliga.

Accomplishments
2. Handball-Bundesliga: 2
: 2010, 2014

Crest, colours, supporters

Kits

Team

Current squad
Squad for the 2019–20 season

Goalkeeper
 12  Martin Tomovski
 16  Gorazd Škof
 72  Stefan Hanemann
Wingers
LW
 11  Jonathan Scholz
 19  Jan Remmlinger
 21  Malte Voigt
 22  Jannik Hofmann
RW
 20  Alexander Falk
 23  Pascal Durak
Line players
 2  Frederic Stüber
 14  Maximilian Haider
 43  Kai Dippe

Back players
LB
 8  Gunnar Dietrich
 10  Daniel Hideg
 55  Azat Valiullin
CB
 24  Pascal Bührer
 25  Dominik Mappes
RB
 27  Jerome Müller
 35  Yessine Meddeb
 37  Max Neuhaus
 77  Jannek Klein

Staff
 Head coach: Ben Matschke
 Assistant coach: Frank Eckhardt
 Assistant coach: Frank Müller

References

External links 

German handball clubs
Handball-Bundesliga
Handball clubs established in 1881
1881 establishments in Germany
Sport in Ludwigshafen